The Remy Grand Brassard and Trophy Race was an automobile race held at the Indianapolis Motor Speedway, on each of four automobile race weekends conducted during the two years prior to the first Indianapolis 500.  The prize was sponsored by magneto manufacturer Frank Remy. In addition to a conventional trophy, the winner was awarded a brassard (or arm shield), designed to be worn by the winner.  The prize also came with a cash bonus of $75 per week until the next Remy Grand race.

Race results

Note:

[a]  Joe Dawson was awarded the victory in the Remy Grand Brassard race of July 2, 1910, after the original first place finisher, Bob Burman, was disqualified.  The disqualification took place a few weeks after the race was run, because Burman's Marquette-Buick car did not meet the rules' definition of a "stock car."  Burman's winning time would have been 1:20:35.64, for a speed of 74.447 mph.

Sources

Scott, D. Bruce; INDY: Racing Before the 500; Indiana Reflections; 2005; .

Galpin, Darren;  A Record of Motorsport Racing Before World War I.

http://www.motorsport.com/stats/champ/byyear.asp?Y=1909
http://www.motorsport.com/stats/champ/byyear.asp?Y=1910

http://www.champcarstats.com/year/1909.htm
http://www.champcarstats.com/year/1910.htm

Auto races in the United States
Motorsport in Indianapolis